Gabriele Gori (born 10 October 1987) is an Italian beach soccer player who plays as a forward.

Known for his agility in scoring many audacious bicycle kicks, he is one of the highest goalscorers of all-time in the sport, having amassed over 700 as of 2020, including winning the top scorer award at the 2017 and 2019 editions of the FIFA Beach Soccer World Cups and becoming the all-time top scorer of the Italian national team. He is recognised as being one the world's best players.

Career

International

Gori originally played association football professionally, reaching as high as Serie C including two clubs between 2006–08.

Gori was invited by a friend to play beach soccer with the team of his hometown, Viareggio, at a festival in 2010. Gori was sceptical about the sport and only accepted the invitation because of his friend's passion. Despite his reservations, the event went well for Gori and he continued to play with Viareggio. That summer, then Italy coach Massimiliano Esposito, having seen Gori play during the Italian League, called him up to the national team for the 2010 Euro Beach Soccer League (EBSL) Superfinal in Lisbon, aged 22.

At the beginning of his career, his father believed he was making the wrong decision dedicating so much time to the sport. However, since then, Gori has cemented his place in the Italian squad, going on to become Italy's all-time top-scorer.

Gori recovered from knee surgery in time to be called up to the Italian team for the 2011 FIFA Beach Soccer World Cup in Ravenna. Subsequently, Gori was the joint second top scorer of the 2015 World Cup and helped Italy win the gold medal at that year's Mediterranean Beach Games, Italy's first major honour since 2005. In 2016, Gori was voted as one of the three best players in the world at the annual Beach Soccer Stars awards and won the Pallone Azzurro (Blue Ball) award for best Italian player of the year bestowed by the Italian Football Federation. His biggest individual accolade came six months later at the 2017 World Cup, where he won the Golden Boot (top scorer) with 17 goals and his 12 goals during the 2018 EBSL season helped Italy secure their first European crown in 13 years, ending 2018 on the verge of 200 goals for Gli Azzurri. A year later, Gori was once again named one of the world's best three players and named amongst the dream team for 2019 at the Beach Soccer Stars awards and ended the season with a silver medal at the 2019 World Cup, winning the Golden Boot once again, the first player to win consecutive top scorer awards since Madjer in 2005 and 2006. He was also named as one of the tournament's top ten best players, out of the 192 participants.

In 2021, Gori was critical of the lack of support for beach soccer from the Italian Football Federation during the COVID-19 pandemic and stated he expects to play for another three years. He scored his 300th goal for Italy in a 3–1 versus Germany at the World Cup qualifiers in June.

Club
Gori had played for Viareggio since 2010, having appeared alongside childhood friends and fellow national team players Andrea Carpita, Dario Ramacciotti, Simone Marinai, Matteo Marrucci and Michele di Palma. His personal highlight came in 2016 when the team won the treble of the Euro Winners Cup (EWC), Coppa Italia and the Italian League. As of 2019, Gori played approximately 150 matches, scoring 360 goals for the club in all competitions. In 2020, it was announced Gori was leaving Viareggio after 10 years, to join Catania on a three year contract.

He has also had brief stints at the EWC and other international clubs events for the likes of Braga of Portugal, Artur Music of Ukraine, Boca Gdańsk of Poland and FC City of Russia.

Style of play
Gori is known for being a prolific goal poacher, possessing exceptional technique in executing goals. He is particularly known for his ability in performing successful bicycle kicks, so much so that he is nicknamed in Italian, “il re delle rovesciate” (English: the king of bicycle kicks). He is also nicknamed, "Tin-Tin".

He studied and modelled his play style off of his beach soccer idol, Amarelle, also known for his acrobatics and overhead kicks.

Personal life
Away from beach soccer, Gori is an estate agent and runs his own business in his hometown. He was formerly a quantity surveyor. He claims to cope well with balancing work and his beach soccer career but that it has got increasingly difficult. Gori has also fathered a son, Cristian (born December 2017). He supports Juventus.

Statistics

Honours
As of 2019 season

The following is a selection, not an exhaustive list, of the major honours Gori has won:

Country
FIFA Beach Soccer World Cup:
Runner-up: 2019
Fourth place: 2015, 2017
Euro Beach Soccer League (1): 2018
Mediterranean Beach Games (1): 2015
European Games:
Silver medal (1): 2015
UEFA qualifiers for the FIFA Beach Soccer World Cup:
Runners-up (1): 2019

Club
Euro Winners Cup (1): 2016
Italian Serie A:
Champion (1): 2016
Runner-up (3): 2012, 2015, 2019
Coppa Italia:
Champion (2): 2012, 2016
Runner-up (1): 2017
Supercoppa Italiana (1): 2018

Individual

FIFA Beach Soccer World Cup
Golden Boot: 2017, 2019
Beach Soccer Stars
World's top 3 best players: 2016, 2019
World dream team: 2019
World Beach Games
Top scorer: 2019
European Games
Top scorer: 2019
UEFA qualifiers for the FIFA Beach Soccer World Cup
Top scorer: 2019
UEFA qualifiers for the World Beach Games
Top scorer: 2019

Euro Beach Soccer Cup
Top scorer: 2016
Euro Winners Cup
Top scorer: 2016, 2017, 2019
Italian Serie A
Top scorer: 2010, 2012, 2014, 2018, 2019
Coppa Italia
Top scorer: 2010, 2014, 2015, 2019
Blue Ball
2016

References

External links
Gabriele Gori, profile at Beach Soccer Worldwide
Gabriele Gori, profile at Beach Soccer Russia (in Russian)

1987 births
Living people
Italian footballers
Italian beach soccer players
Association football forwards
European Games silver medalists for Italy
Beach soccer players at the 2015 European Games
European Games medalists in beach soccer
Beach soccer players at the 2019 European Games
Real estate brokers
People from Viareggio
Sportspeople from the Province of Lucca
Footballers from Tuscany